Rian Murphy is a drummer and producer for the Chicago record label Drag City, and also acts as the company's sales director.

He has worked with Appendix Out, Palace Music, Smog, Royal Trux, the Silver Jews and Edith Frost.  In 2000, Murphy released the EP All Most Heaven with Will Oldham.

Murphy was also involved in the comedy series People Under the Stares.

References

American record producers
Living people
Silver Jews members
Year of birth missing (living people)